In the mathematical field of geometric measure theory, the coarea formula expresses the integral of a function over an open set in Euclidean space in terms of integrals over the level sets of another function.  A special case is Fubini's theorem, which says under suitable hypotheses that the integral of a function over the region enclosed by a rectangular box can be written as the iterated integral over the level sets of the coordinate functions.  Another special case is integration in spherical coordinates, in which the integral of a function on Rn is related to the integral of the function over spherical shells: level sets of the radial function.  The formula plays a decisive role in the modern study of isoperimetric problems.

For smooth functions the formula is a result in multivariate calculus which follows from a change of variables.

A precise statement of the formula is as follows. Then, for an L1 function g,

where Hn−1 is the (n − 1)-dimensional Hausdorff measure.  In particular, by taking g to be one, this implies

and conversely the latter equality implies the former by standard techniques in Lebesgue integration.

More generally, the coarea formula can be applied to Lipschitz functions u defined in  taking on values in  where k ≤ n.  In this case, the following identity holds

where Jku is the k-dimensional Jacobian of u whose determinant is given by

Applications
 Taking u(x) = |x − x0| gives the formula for integration in spherical coordinates of an integrable function f:

 Combining the coarea formula with the isoperimetric inequality gives a proof of the Sobolev inequality for W1,1 with best constant:

where  is the volume of the unit ball in

See also
 Sard's theorem
 Smooth coarea formula

References
.
.

.

Measure theory